Z